The athletics at the 1982 Asian Games were held in Jawaharlal Nehru Stadium, New Delhi, India.

Medalists

Men

Women

Medal table

References
Asian Games Results. GBR Athletics. Retrieved on 2014-10-04.
Women's relay medallists. Incheon2014. Retrieved on 2014-10-04.
Men's relay medallists. Incheon2014. Retrieved on 2014-10-04.
Asian Games Results

 
1982 Asian Games events
1982
Asian Games
1982 Asian Games
1982 Asian Games